Alangottai is a village in Thiruvarur district in the state of Tamil Nadu, India. It lies between Mannargudi and Pattukkottai on State Highway 146. 

The nearest railway station is at Mannargudi.

Temples:, Mazhai Mari Amman Kovil, Ayyanar Kovil, Agora Veerabadhran Kovil, Veeranar Kovil 

The village has two Government Schools - Primary and a higher secondary school.

References

Villages in Tiruvarur district